The Florida Mall is a super regional enclosed shopping mall located south of Orlando in unincorporated Orange County, Florida, United States, on the southeast corner of Orange Blossom Trail and Sand Lake Road; it opened in 1986. The facility was developed by a Joint Venture of Eddie DeBartolo of DeBartolo Realty & JCP Realty, Inc. (Subsidiary of J. C. Penney Company) starting in 1979-1984; it is currently managed by Simon Property Group, which owns 50%, having fallen to Simon following the 1996 merger of Simon and DeBartolo Realty into Simon DeBartolo Group. With  of gross leasable area and 294 retailers, it is one of the largest single-story malls in the United States and the largest mall in Central Florida.

The Florida Mall is mostly a draw for entertainment and normal mall retailers as the nearby Mall at Millenia handles most of Central Florida's upscale shopping.

The mall is anchored by Dillard's, Macy's, JCPenney, Sears, Dick's Sporting Goods, and the Crayola Experience.

Location

The Florida Mall is located in an unincorporated area of Orange County, Florida south of the city of Orlando. The mall is close to Orlando International Airport and many other Orlando attractions including Universal Orlando Resort, Walt Disney World, SeaWorld Orlando, and International Drive. The Florida Mall is located at the southeast corner of the intersection between US 17/US 92/US 441 (Orange Blossom Trail) and SR 482 (Sand Lake Road) and is situated near the junction of SR 528 (Beachline Expressway) and Florida's Turnpike.

Description
The mall is one level and is anchored by Dillard's, Macy's, JCPenney, Sears, Dick's Sporting Goods, and the Crayola Experience. Attached to the mall is The Florida Hotel & Conference Center, which contains 511 rooms. The Florida Mall contains numerous smaller stores and entertainment venues including the only American Girl and Disney Store locations in the Orlando area, Apple Store, A/X Armani Exchange, Banana Republic, Michael Kors, Zara, H&M, XXI Forever, Victoria's Secret, MAC Cosmetics, Sephora, and Bath & Body Works. The mall offers various dining options including 25 quick-service restaurants and 8 sit-down restaurants. The Florida Mall features a  Dining Pavilion that contains a total of 25 restaurants. The mall offers various services to shoppers including valet parking, currency exchange, and package and baggage check. The Florida Mall attracts over 20 million visitors annually, including domestic and international tourists to the Orlando area.

History

The mall opened on March 12, 1986, with Sears, JCPenney, Belk and the Crowne Plaza hotel (built by E.J. DeBartolo and owned in partnership with Pratt Hotel Corporation of Dallas Texas), followed by Robinson's in September of that year.  Many of the mall’s design features were borrowed from other DeBartolo malls like Aventura Mall for many expansions and Coral Square for its layout and space frame ceiling. A year later, store acquisitions and consolidations started varying the anchor lineup. Robinson's converted to Maison Blanche in August 1987, and the Crowne Plaza rebranded as a Sheraton Plaza in 1988. Dillard's opened two stores in 1991 at the east end filling the two remaining anchor pads. Maison Blanche was rebranded by Gayfers in early 1992 as a result of Mercantile Stores. In 1996, Belk became Saks Fifth Avenue, while the Sheraton hotel was sold to Adam's Mark. Then, in 1998, Gayfers transitioned into Parisian, whereas Dillard's added a second floor to their newly consolidated store at the east end, closing the other store on the southeast side that was razed for a new wing featuring Burdines, which opened in 1999. Lord & Taylor replaced Parisian in 2002 (as part of a plan to convert 9 Proffitt's stores into May), and the east wing was expanded again with Central Florida's first and only Nordstrom, in order to compete with the newly built Mall at Millenia. Burdines merged with Macy's in 2003, and in 2004, the hotel was purchased by a group headed by the Bank of Scotland and was renamed The Florida Hotel & Conference Center. Burdines-Macy's simply became Macy's in 2005.

The Florida Mall later lost all of its luxury anchor stores, Lord & Taylor closed in 2006, three years after the company announced the store would close. Saks Fifth Avenue closed in 2014 after it was chosen as one of the stores to be closed when purchased by Hudson Bay Co. A few months after Saks closed, the mall received its biggest loss when Nordstrom announced that it would be closing its Florida Mall location on August 16, 2014, due to underperforming sales compared to the rest of the stores. Retail analysts blamed the poor sales at the Nordstrom location at The Florida Mall on competition from the Mall at Millenia and outlet malls, a lack of local affluent shoppers in the Orlando area, and a higher demand for casual clothing over formal clothing. Many Orlando residents were upset after Central Florida's only Nordstrom was closed. It led to much controversy on whether or not Nordstrom would have done better in Orlando if it was located with more upscale shopping like at the Mall at Millenia.

Lord & Taylor was demolished in 2007 and turned into a new outdoor plaza with stores Forever 21, H&M and Zara in 2009, with American Girl being added in the Fall of 2014. In June 2015, Nordstrom was divided into Dick's Sporting Goods and the Crayola Experience. The Saks Fifth Avenue store was gutted and was repurposed as a new wing with a new Dining Pavilion. The old food court was closed and renovated into a to include more retail and dining space. the new stores are Champs Sports and Footaction that are next to the existing Foot Locker store.

El Meson opened its first American store at the Florida Mall in 2015.

In 2017, Shake Shack opened at the mall in the space formerly occupied by Ruby Tuesday, which closed in June 2015.

In early 2019, the mall hosted the Cirque du Soleil touring show Luzia under the big top. This limited engagement was the first time Cirque's iconic big top has been raised in the Orlando area.

In late 2019, Mars Retail Group announced that their M&M's World Orlando location would be closing its Florida Mall shop and would be moving to Disney Springs in 2020.

Along with The Gardens Mall in Palm Beach Gardens and a standalone store in Miami, The Florida Mall is home to one of three last remaining Sears stores in Florida.

Current anchors
Sears (original tenant) (March 12, 1986 – present)
JCPenney (original tenant) (March 12, 1986 – present)
Dillard's (1993–present)
Macy's (March 6, 2005 – present)
Dick's Sporting Goods (June 2015 – present)
Crayola Experience (June 2015 – present)

Former anchors
Belk-Lindsey (March 12, 1986 – 1996)
Burdines (October 27, 1999 – March 6, 2005)
Gayfers (1992–1998)
Maison Blanche (1987–1992)
Nordstrom (2002 – August 16, 2014), now Crayola Experience and Dick's Sporting Goods
Parisian (1998–2001)
Robinson's (March 12, 1986 – 1987)
Saks Fifth Avenue (1996–2014), now the Dining Pavilion
Lord & Taylor (2002–2006), now XXI Forever, Zara, H&M and American Girl Place
M&M's World (2005–2020)

Junior anchors
 Old Navy (opened 1998)
 Zara (opened 2015)
 XXI Forever (opened 2009)
 H&M (opened 2009)

In popular culture
The Florida Mall was prominently featured in a 1989 episode of the TBS cable television series The New Leave It To Beaver.

Transportation
Right next to the mall stretches SR 528 (Beachline Expressway) which has an interchange with US 17/US 92/US 441 (Orange Blossom Trail) at exit 4. The exit is only few exits away from the Orlando International Airport. The mall is also accessible from exit 254 of Florida's Turnpike, which connects to Orange Blossom Trail.

The mall is serviced by Lynx buses (links) 7, 37, 42, 107, 108, 111, 418, and 441 at the Florida Mall SuperStop. The Florida Mall SuperStop has direct bus service from several points in the Orlando area including Lynx Central Station in Downtown Orlando, Kissimmee, Orlando International Airport, SeaWorld Orlando, and Universal Orlando Resort.

References

External links

The Florida Mall Official Website

Shopping malls established in 1986
Simon Property Group
Shopping malls in Florida
Tourist attractions in Orlando, Florida
Buildings and structures in Orlando, Florida
1986 establishments in Florida